"Sunday Best" is a song by Australian musician Washington, released in August 2010 as the lead single from her debut studio album, I Believe You Liar.

Composition
The song is an upbeat alternative/pop rock song in common time. It features keyboards, drums and electric bass. It consists of several guitar and keyboard riffs.

Music video
The music video was released on YouTube 27 July 2010. The video is themed as a black and white film, with musical themes.
It consists of Washington and two bandmates in a restaurant, beginning with French dialogue and then progressing to a musical like scene. The clip contains references to French New Wave cinema, and is filmed in that style.
The video was filmed in Brisbane, Australia.

The music video also features Michael Tomlinson of the band Yves Klein Blue.

Charts

Certifications

References

2010 singles
2010 songs
Mercury Records singles
Megan Washington songs
Songs written by Megan Washington